Bianca Castro (born November 29, 1980), commonly known as Jiggly Caliente, is a Filipino-American drag performer, singer, and actress best known for competing on the fourth season of RuPaul's Drag Race, the sixth season of RuPaul's Drag Race All Stars, for judging Drag Race Philippines, and for her recurring role as Veronica Ferocity on the FX series Pose. She released her debut album, T.H.O.T. Process on March 9, 2018. In 2020, she co-hosted Translation, the first talk show on a major network hosted by an all-trans cast.

Early life 
Caliente was born in San Pedro, Laguna, Philippines. In the first grade, she was expelled from school for stabbing a bully through the hand with a pencil. She moved to America in 1991 at age 10 with her mother and brother and lived in Sunnyside, Queens, New York City. She came out in junior high school to her late mother, and her drag mother is Chevelle Brooks. Her drag first name is based on the Pokémon Jigglypuff, and her original drag name was Jiggly Puff.

Drag Race and career 
Caliente was announced to be one of thirteen contestants in the fourth season of RuPaul's Drag Race on November 13, 2011. She placed eighth overall, being eliminated in a lip sync by seventh placer Willam. She was in archive footage in the season 5 finale, and made an appearance at the season six live finale, where she asked a viewer question to Bianca Del Rio.

Outside of Drag Race, she can be seen in the beginning of the 2012 NewNowNext awards. Her acting career began in 2015 when she played a role in the season-two finale of Broad City as a shop owner. She was one of thirty drag queens featured in Miley Cyrus's 2015 VMA performance. In 2016, she was in the pilot episode of Search Party. In 2017, she played a part with fellow Drag Race alumni Bob The Drag Queen, Katya and Detox in a season finale episode of Playing House. She made an appearance as a backup singer on the music video for Bob The Drag Queen and Alaska's "Yet Another Dig". She played the character Veronica in Pose, appearing in the sixth and eighth episodes of the first season. She later confirmed she would be back for more episodes of Pose's second season, on Bootleg Fashion Photo Review, and the web series by Drag Race alum Yuhua Hamasaki.

In September 2018, Caliente performed as a background dancer behind Christina Aguilera for Opening Ceremony's Spring 2019 collection alongside other Drag Race alumni. In November 2018, she made an appearance on Saturday Night Live with Drag Race alumn Peppermint, as a Drag Queen for the Garmin GP-Yasss sketch.

In 2020, Jiggly Caliente co-hosted Translation, the first talk show on a major network hosted by an all-trans cast.

On May 26, 2021, she was announced to be one of the 13 queens returning for RuPaul’s Drag Race: All Stars Season 6. She was eliminated in the second episode, placing twelfth overall.

She is a main judge on the first season of Drag Race Philippines, which premiered on August 17 2022.

Music 
Caliente released her first single, "Fckboi" on March 1, 2018, on her official Vevo channel. She released her debut album, T.H.O.T. Process on March 9, 2018. The twelve-track album features Drag Race alumni Sharon Needles, Peppermint, Alaska, Ginger Minj, Phi Phi O'Hara (Credited as Jaremi Carey) and Manila Luzon. It also features an intro with RuPaul. The album is the first hip-hop based record by a Drag Race alumni. The music video for the song "All This Body" premiered on November 30, 2018, and featured Alaska, Minj and Isis King.

She also was a featured artist for the first three volumes of the Drag Race Christmas Queens albums. The music video for "Ratchet Christmas" from the first volume was uploaded on December 9, 2015. She contributed to the compilation album Christmas Queens 3 (2017).

Personal life 
Caliente publicly came out as transgender in 2016.

Discography

Albums

Singles

Filmography

Film

Television

Music videos

Web series

See also 
 Filipinos in the New York metropolitan area
 LGBT culture in New York City
 List of self-identified LGBTQ New Yorkers

References

External links 

 

Living people
1981 births
Asian-American drag queens
American LGBT people of Asian descent
Filipino LGBT singers
Filipino LGBT actors
RuPaul's Drag Race All Stars contestants
Jiggly Caliente
LGBT media personalities
Transgender women
Transgender drag performers
Drag Race Philippines